Minuscule 27 (in the Gregory-Aland numbering), ε 1023 (Soden). It is a Greek minuscule manuscript of the New Testament, written on vellum. Palaeographically it has been assigned to the 10th-century. It has liturgical books and marginalia.

Description 

The codex contains a complete text of the four Gospels, on 460 leaves, though from John 18:3 the text is supplied. The text is written in one column per page, 19 lines per page. It is ornamented in gold and silver.

There is also a division according to the Ammonian Sections (in Mark 241, the last section in 16:20), with references to the Eusebian Canons (written below Ammonian Section numbers).

Liturgical books with hagiographies (Synaxarion and Menologion) were added by a later hand.

It was extensively altered by a later hand.

Text 

The Greek text of the codex is a representative of the Byzantine text-type (the text-types are groups of different manuscripts which share specific or generally related readings, which then differ from each other group, and thus the conflicting readings can separate out the groups, which are then used to determine the original text as published; there are three main groups with names: Alexandrian, Western, and Byzantine). Biblical scholar and textual critic Kurt Aland placed it in Category V according to his manuscript text classification system. It belongs to the textual Family 1424.

According to the Claremont Profile Method it represents textual cluster M27 (as a core member). It creates cluster, to which belong the manuscripts: 71, 569, 692, 750, 1170, 1222, 1413, 1415, 1458, 1626, 2715.

The omitted text  was inserted in the right hand margin as a correction.

History 

The codex is dated by the INTF to the 11th-century.

The first collation was prepared by Larroque (along with the codices 28-33), but it was very imperfect.

The codex was examined and described by John Mill (Colb. 1), Wettstein, Scholz (1794-1852), and Paulin Martin. C. R. Gregory saw the manuscript in 1885.

The codex is currently housed at the Bibliothèque nationale de France (Gr. 115) at Paris.

See also 

 List of New Testament minuscules
 Biblical manuscripts
 Textual criticism

References

External links 
 R. Waltz, Minuscule 27 at the Encyclopaedia of Textual Criticism (2008)
 Images from Microfilm of manuscript on the CSNTM website.
 Images of manuscript online at the Bibliothèque Nationale de France website.

Greek New Testament minuscules
10th-century biblical manuscripts
Bibliothèque nationale de France collections